Returns, in economics and political economy, are the distributions or payments awarded to the various suppliers of a good or service

Wages
Wages are the return to labor—the return to an individual's involvement (mental or physical) in the creation or realization of goods or services. Wages are realized by an individual supplier of labor even if the supplier is the self. A person gathering mushrooms in a national forest for the purpose of personal consumption is realizing wages in the form of mushrooms.  A payer of wages is paying for a service performed by one or more individuals and sees wages as a cost.

Rent
In classical economics rent was the return to an "owner" of land. In later economic theory this term is expanded as economic rent to include other forms of unearned income typically realized from barriers to entry. Land ownership is considered to be a barrier to entry because land owners make no contribution to the production process. They simply prevent others from using that which would otherwise be useful.

Interest

The classical economists referred to the fee paid for the use of money or stock as "interest" but declared this to be a derivative income. The distinction between interest and profit is murky:

"Whoever derives his revenue from a fund which is his own, must draw it either from his labor, from his stock, or from his land. The revenue derived from labor is called wages. That derived from stock, by the person who manages or employs it, is called profit. That derived from it by the person who does not employ it himself, but lends it to another, is called the interest (f)or the use of money (or stock). It is the compensation which the borrower pays to the lender, for the profit which he has an opportunity of making by the use of the money (or stock). Part of that profit naturally belongs to the borrower, who runs the risk and takes the trouble of employing it; and part to the lender, who affords him the opportunity of making this profit. The interest of money is always a derivative revenue, which, if it is not paid from the profit which is made by the use of the money, must be paid from some other source of revenue, unless perhaps the borrower is a spendthrift, who contracts a second debt in order to pay the interest of the first." (Smith)

Smith uses the word profit in two different ways here. Is the owner of the money/tractor in his capacity as owner realizing profit or interest? It is certain that the proprietor of the money/tractor is realizing profit as opposed to interest. See "Smith on Profits and Interest" below.

Profit

In Classical Economics profit is the return to the proprietor(s) of capital stocks (machinery, tools, structures).  If I lease a backhoe from a tool rental company the amount I pay to the backhoe owner it is seen by me as "rent".  But that same flow as seen by the supplier of the backhoe is "interest" (i.e. the return to loaned stock/money).

For the individual who rented the backhoe from the rental company, profit is the wages that would have been required excavating by hand, minus the rent paid for the backhoe, minus the smaller amount of wages required using the backhoe. Gross profit is value of result minus rent or depreciation. Real profit is what remains after I pay for the operation of the backhoe.

In The Wealth of Nations Adam Smith said the following on profits and interest.

Neoclassical economics 
In neoclassical economics profit is total investment performance and includes economic rent.

Total investment return 
The total investment return, also called investment performance, includes direct incomes (dividends, interests...) and capital gains (less capital losses) due to changes in the asset market value.

See also 
 Internal rate of return
 Marginal return
 Rate of return
 Return on investment
 Returns and risk

Notes

Factor income distribution
Financial economics